Tupla is a village in the Abbottabad District of the Khyber Pakhtunkhwa province of Pakistan. It is located at 34°0'0N 73°20'0E with an altitude of 1781 metres (5846 feet).

References

Populated places in Abbottabad District